Allagelena is a genus of Asian funnel weavers first described by Z. S. Zhang, Ming-Sheng Zhu & D. X. Song in 2006.

Taxonomy
The genus was created in 2006, initially for four Chinese species previously placed in Agelena. The name Allagelena is derived from allo-, different, and the genus name Agelena, so meaning "different from Agelena", specifically in male and female sexual characters. Three further species were later transferred to this genus.

Species
 it contains nine species:

Allagelena bifida (Wang, 1997) – China
Allagelena bistriata (Grube, 1861) – Russia (Far East), China
Allagelena difficilis (Fox, 1936) – China, Korea
Allagelena donggukensis (Kim, 1996) – Korea, Japan
Allagelena gracilens (C. L. Koch, 1841) – Europe to Central Asia
Allagelena koreana (Paik, 1965) – China, Korea
Allagelena monticola Chami-Kranon, Likhitrakarn & Dankittipakul, 2007 – Thailand
Allagelena opulenta (L. Koch, 1878) – Korea, Japan
Allagelena scopulata (Wang, 1991) – China

References

Agelenidae
Spiders of Asia
Araneomorphae genera